The 2022 Wrestling World Cup - Men's freestyle was the first Wrestling World Cup in 2022 which took place in   Coralville, Iowa, United States on December 10–11, 2022.

Pool stage

Pool A

Pool B

Medal Matches

Final ranking

See also
2022 Wrestling World Cup - Men's Greco-Roman
2022 Wrestling World Cup - Women's freestyle

References

External links
 Official website
 Results Book

Wrestling World Cup
freestyle wrestling
2022 in American sports
2022 in sport wrestling
International wrestling competitions hosted by the United States
Sports in Iowa
Wrestling in Iowa
Wrestling World Cup